Takla Narrows Aerodrome  was an aerodrome located adjacent to Takla Lake in the Takla Lake Marine Provincial Park, British Columbia, Canada.

See also
Takla Landing Water Aerodrome

References

Defunct airports in British Columbia
Regional District of Bulkley-Nechako